Joe Hilton (20 July 1931 – June 1995) was an English professional footballer who played as an inside forward in the Football League for Leeds United and Chester.

References

1931 births
1995 deaths
People from Goldthorpe
Association football inside forwards
English footballers
Armthorpe Welfare F.C. players
Leeds United F.C. players
Chester City F.C. players
Goole Town F.C. players
English Football League players